USCGC Saranac was a  of the United States Coast Guard launched on 12 April 1930 and commissioned on 2 October 1930. After 11 years of service with the Coast Guard, she was transferred to the Royal Navy as part of the Lend-Lease Act.

Career

Coast Guard – Saranac
After being commissioned 2 October 1930, Saranac was homeported in Galveston, Texas and participated in regular patrols.

Royal Navy – Banff
After being transferred to the Royal Navy the newly named HMS Banff (Y43) was commissioned on 30 April 1941 . On 8 August 1942, she rescued 18 people from the Norwegian tanker Mirlo which was torpedoed by U-130. On 27 February 1946 she was returned to the USCG.

Coast Guard – Sebec / Tampa

After the end of the World War II, she was transferred back to the USCG on 27 February 1946. Initially given the name Sebec (WPG 164), she was renamed Tampa before being commissioned 27 May 1947.

See also
 List of United States Coast Guard cutters

References

Lake-class cutters
Ships of the United States Coast Guard
World War II patrol vessels of the United States
1930 ships
Banff-class sloops